Big Catch may refer to:

 The Big Catch, a 1920 short Western film
 Big Catch (slot machine), casino slot machine